The Solstice class is a class of cruise ships primarily operated by Celebrity Cruises, a subsidiary of Royal Caribbean Cruises Ltd. The class is constructed by Meyer Werft of Germany. At present, there are five active Solstice-class ships: the lead vessel of the class, ; the second ship of the class, ; and the third ship of the class, which was delivered on 15 April 2010. The fourth ship, sailed on her maiden voyage on 23 July 2011; and the fifth, was launched in August 2012. The first Solstice-class ship, Celebrity Solstice entered service in November 2008 and is the namesake of the class. All Solstice-class vessels have post-Panamax dimensions.

History 
The first Solstice-class vessel was ordered in year 2005 at Meyer Werft, with one vessel as the first option. Later, option for second vessel was exercised. Meyer Werft reached several milestones in their career while building the Solstice class. It was their first time to build 122,000 GT cruise ships having post-Panamax dimensions. By that time, the class were the largest cruise ships ever built at the facility. On February and July 2006, the second and the third vessel was ordered respectively. The order for the fourth and fifth ship followed in 2007 and 2008. The class consists of five ships, with expected delivery of one ship each year, from 2008 to 2012, at a total cost of US$3.7 billion.

Concept and construction 
The keel of Celebrity Solstice was laid on 11 October 2006, and was delivered on 24 October 2008. The keel of Celebrity Equinox was laid on 6 August 2008 and delivered on 16 July 2009. The keel of Celebrity Eclipse was laid on 23 January 2009 and was delivered on 15 April 2010. The fourth ship, Celebrity Silhouette was delivered on 18 July 2011 and the fifth and final ship, Celebrity Reflection was handed over on 9 October 2012.

Features 

A special type of grass, Agrostis stolonifera, is used for the lawn. The areas such as Patio on the Lawn, Sunset Bar, Lawn Club Shop and The Hot Glass Show are found on the lawn. The staterooms on Solstice-class ships are significantly larger than the previous classes, with 80% having a veranda. The staterooms are grouped into seven categories; including the spa-inspired AquaClass and the Concierge class. There are two Penthouse Suites, a  stateroom and several Royal Suites, a  stateroom. Both have a living room, dining room and separate bedrooms. There are also Jacuzzis and separate showers. The Solstice class feature amenities such as large staterooms, a large theater, and multiple dining options. Signature Celebrity features were also added, such as the Martini Bar. The newest feature of the class is the iLounge, a combination of Internet café and an Apple Store. This feature was 
added to Celebrity Eclipse and Celebrity Silhouette, and on Celebrity Solstice in May 2010.

Design 
The original renderings for the Solstice class was to have powder blue upper decks and funnels. Because Celebrity uses dark blue as a trademark on their ships, the powder blue was subsequently changed to dark blue. The lead vessel, Celebrity Solstice, carries the original concept and design for the class, such as twin funnels with a small "X" on the front funnel and a large "X" on the railings of the hump staterooms. Several months after her service, the "X" logo on the railings were seen by Celebrity as a design flaw. Due to this, the "X" logo on the railings was removed from Celebrity Equinox and Celebrity Eclipse and from future Solstice-class ships. In order to compensate, the small "X" on the front funnel was enlarged on ships following Celebrity Solstice.

Ship facts 
 Gross tonnage: 122,000 GT
 Length: 
 Width: 
 Cost: $750 million

Ships

References 

Cruise ship classes
Ships of Celebrity Cruises